Ayaz Tasawwar (born 10 December 1990) is a Pakistani first-class cricketer who plays for Balochistan. In January 2021, he was named in Balochistan's squad for the 2020–21 Pakistan Cup.

References

External links
 

1990 births
Living people
Pakistani cricketers
Balochistan cricketers
Water and Power Development Authority cricketers
Cricketers from Sheikhupura
Central Punjab cricketers